The following is a list of kibbutzim in Israel, grouped by affiliation, with their year of foundation in brackets. 
In 2004, there were 266 kibbutzim with population 116,000 or 2.1% of the Jewish population of Israel.
In 2010, there were 270 kibbutzim in Israel with population of 126,000.

Kibbutzim in the Kibbutz Movement

Adamit (1958)
Afek (1939)
Afik (1967)
Afikim (1932)
Almog (1977)
Allonim (1938)
Alumot (1947)
Ami'ad (1946)
Amir (1939)
Ashdot Ya'akov Ihud (1953), from Ashdot Ya'akov (1924, 1933)
Ashdot Ya'akov Meuhad (1953), from Ashdot Ya'akov (1924, 1933)
Ayelet HaShahar (1918)
Bahan (1953)
Bar'am (1949)
Barkai (1949)
Be'eri (1946)
Beit Alfa (1922)
Beit Guvrin (1949)
Beit HaArava (1939)
Beit HaEmek (1949)
Beit HaShita (1928)
Beit Kama (1949)
Beit Keshet (1944)
Beit Nir (1955)
Beit Zera (1921)
Beth-El (1970)
Bror Hayil (1948)
Dafna (1939)
Dalia (1939)
Dan (1939)
Degania Alef (1910)
Degania Bet (1920)
Dorot (1941)
Dovrat (1948)
Dvir (1951)
Eilon (1938)
Eilot (1962)
Ein Carmel (1947)
Ein Dor (1948)
Ein Gedi (1953)
Ein Gev (1937)
Ein HaHoresh (1931)
Ein HaMifratz (1938)
Ein Harod (Ihud) (1952), from Ein Harod (1921–1952)
Ein Harod (Meuhad) (1952), from Ein Harod (1921–1952)
Ein HaShlosha (1950)
Ein HaShofet (1937)
Ein Shemer (1927)
Ein Zivan (1968)
Einat (1925)
El Rom (1971)
Elifaz (1982)
Erez (1950)
Eshbal (1998)
Evron (1937)
Eyal (1949)
Ga'aton (1948)
Ga'ash (1951)
Gadot (1949)
Gal On (1946)
Galed (1945)
Gan Shmuel (1920)
Gat (1941)
Gazit (1948)
Gesher (1939)
Gesher HaZiv (1949)
Geshur (1971)
Geva (1921)
Gevim (1947)
Gezer (1945)
Gilgal (1972)
Ginegar (1922), from Degania Gimel (1920–1922)
Ginosar (1937)
Givat Brenner (1928)
Givat Haim (Ihud) (1953)
Givat Haim (Meuhad) (1953)
Givat HaShlosha (1925)
Givat Oz (1949)
Glil Yam (1943)
Gonen (1951)
Grofit (1966)
Gevat (1926)
Gvulot (1943)
HaGoshrim (1948)
Hahoterim (1952)
Hamadia (1939)
Hanaton (1984)
Hanita (1938)
HaOgen (1947)
Harduf (1982)
Harel (1948)
HaSolelim (1949)
Hatzerim (1946)
Hatzor (1946)
Hazorea (1936)
Heftziba (1922)
Holit (1982)
Hokuk (1946)
Horshim (1955)
Hulda (1930)
Kabri (1949)
Kalia (1974)
Karmia (1950)
Ketura (1970)
Kfar Blum (1943)
Kfar Giladi (1916)
Kfar HaHoresh (1933)
Kfar HaMaccabi (1936)
Kfar HaNassi (1948)
Kfar Haruv (1973)
Kfar Masaryk (1933)
Kfar Menahem (1937)
Kfar Ruppin (1938)
Kfar Szold (1942)
Kfar Yehoshua (1927)
Kinneret (1913)
Kiryat Anavim (1920)
Kissufim (1951)
Kramim (1980)
Lahav (1952)
Lehavot HaBashan (1945)
Lehavot Haviva (1949)
Lohamey HaGeta'ot (1949)
Lotan (1983)
Ma'abarot (1925)
Ma'agan Michael (1949)
Ma'ale HaHamisha (1938)
Ma'anit (1942)
Malkia (1949)
Manara (1943)
Maoz Haim (1937)
Mashabei Sadeh (1947)
Matzuba (1940)
Ma'ayan Barukh (1947)
Ma'ayan Tzvi (1938)
Magal (1953)
Magen (1949)
Mefalsim (1949)
Megiddo (1949)
Merhavia (1929)
Mesilot (1938)
Metzer (1953)
Mevo Hama (1968)
Misgav Am (1946)
Migvan (1987)
Mishmar HaEmek (1922)
Mishmar HaNegev (1946)
Mishmar HaSharon (1924)
Mizra (1923)
Na'an (1930)
Nahal Oz (1951)
Neot Mordechai (1946)
Neot Smadar (1989)
Netiv HaLamed-Heh (1949)
Netzer Sereni (1948)
Neve Eitan (1938)
Neve Harif (1987)
Neve Ilan (1978)
Neve Ur  (1948)
Neve Yam (1939)
Nir Am (1949)
Nir David (1936)
Nir Eliyahu (1950)
Nir Oz (1955)
Nir Yitzhak (1949)
Nirim (1946)
Nitzanim (1951)
Or HaNer (1957)
Ortal (1978)
Palmachim (1949)
Parod (1949)
Pelekh (1982)
Ramat David (1926)
Ramat HaKovesh (1932)
Ramat HaShofet (1941)
Ramat Rachel (1925)
Ramat Yohanan (1931)
Ramot Menashe (1948)
Ravid (1981)
Re'im (1949)
Regavim (1948)
Reshafim (1948)
Retamim (1988)
Revadim (1947)
Revivim (1943)
Rosh HaNikra (1949)
Ruhama  (1944)
Sa'ar (1948)
Samar (1976)
Sarid (1926)
Sasa (1949)
Sde Boker (1952)
Sde Nahum (1937)
Sde Nehemia (1940)
Sde Yoav (1956)
Sdot Yam (1940)
Sha'ar HaAmakim (1935)
Sha'ar HaGolan (1937)
Shamir (1944)
Shefayim (1935)
Shiller (1927)
Shomrat (1948)
Shoval (1946)
Snir (1967)
Sufa (1975)
Tamuz (1987)
Tel Katzir (1949)
Tel Yitzhak (1938)
Tel Yosef (1921)
Tlalim (1980)
Tuval (1981)
Tze'elim (1947)
Tzivon (1980)
Tzora (1948)
Tzova (1948)
Urim (1946)
Usha (1937)
Yad Hannah (1950)
Yad Mordechai (1943)
Yagur (1922)
Yahad (1984)
Yahel (1976)
Yasur (1949)
Yehiam (1946)
Yifat (1954)
Yiftah (1948)
Yiron  (1949)
Yizre'el (1948)
Yotvata (1957)
Zikim (1949)

Kibbutzim in the Religious Kibbutz Movement

Alumim (1966)
Be'erot Yitzhak (1943)
Beit Rimon (1979)
Ein Tzurim (1946)
Ein HaNatziv (1946)
Kfar Etzion (1927, 1934, 1943, 1967)
Lavi (1949)
Ma'ale Gilboa (1963)
Meirav (1987)
Migdal Oz (1977)
Rosh Tzurim (1969)
Sa'ad (1947)
Sde Eliyahu (1939)
Shluhot (1948)
Tirat Zvi (1937)
Yavne (1941)

Non-affiliated religious kibbutzim
Hafetz Haim (1944)
Sha'alvim (1951)
Retamim (1983)

Privatized kibbutzim
Most kibbutzim are currently in a process of privatisation, which takes different forms in each individual kibbutz. This partial list is thus seriously lagging behind reality.
Beit Oren (1939)
Gesher HaZiv (1949)
Degania Alef (1910)
Nahsholim (1948)
Masada (1937)
Mishmar David (1948)
Netzarim (1984)
Neve Ilan (1946)
Yakum (1938/1947)

Kibbutzim which became community settlements
HaOn (est. 1949; community settlement since 2007)
Mishmar David (est. 1948; community settlement since 2003)

See also 
 List of Moshavim

References 

 
Kibbutz